Rejoice "Joyi" Kapfumvuti (born 18 November 1991) is a Zimbabwean association football player. She is a member of the Zimbabwe women's national football team and represented the country in their Olympic debut at the 2016 Summer Olympics.

Bulawayo-born Kapfumvuti became known as "The Maestro" for her performances for the successful Inline Academy club. Frustration with the level of domestic competition in Zimbabwe meant Kapfumvuti planned to retire from football after the 2016 Olympics.

References

External links

 

Zimbabwean women's footballers
Zimbabwe women's international footballers
Footballers at the 2016 Summer Olympics
Olympic footballers of Zimbabwe
Living people
1991 births
Sportspeople from Bulawayo
Women's association football midfielders